Ron Joyce Stadium is a football stadium owned by McMaster University in Hamilton, Ontario, Canada.

The stadium is the home of the McMaster Marauders football team and the Hamilton Nationals of Major League Lacrosse. The stadium features 6,000 permanent seats and temporary seating for an additional 6,000 on the other side of the field when needed for national events. An underground parking garage is below the stadium grounds that will serve visitors to the stadium plus daily campus parking needs. The Hamilton Tiger-Cats of the Canadian Football League also use the stadium for training during the spring and summer.

The stadium features a large press box with facilities for live TV and radio broadcasts, as well as working areas for  print media, game operations staff, as well as home and visiting team coaches and spotters.

The participant level of the stadium features dressing rooms for the visiting teams and game officials, as well as more luxurious dressing room facilities for Marauder football, soccer, and rugby teams. There is also a satellite sports medicine clinic for players to receive taping and treatments. Multi-purpose rooms are also used for video review of game tape.

The dressing rooms are also used for players and referees taking part in contests in the Burridge gym as there was a lack of quality, private accommodations for officials and players previous to the stadium's completion.

The Marauders played their Ontario University Athletics games in 2005, 2006, and 2007 at the Hamilton Tiger-Cats' Ivor Wynne Stadium. Inversely, the Tiger-Cats began their 2014 season at Ron Joyce Stadium after Tim Hortons Field fell behind schedule in construction.

References

External links
McMaster receives historic donation of $10-million for new stadium
Ron Joyce Stadium

Sports venues in Hamilton, Ontario
Canadian Football League venues
McMaster University
Athletics (track and field) venues in Ontario
Lacrosse venues
Former Major League Lacrosse venues
University sports venues in Canada
2008 establishments in Ontario
Sports venues completed in 2008
Canadian football venues in Ontario
Soccer venues in Ontario